Ntumba Massanka (born 30 November 1996) is an English professional footballer who plays as a striker for Macclesfield.

Career
Massanka was born in Tottenham, London, and moved to Manchester aged four, as his parents relocated with their work as pastors. He was signed by Manchester United after being scouted, and spent six years with the club before a short stint with rivals Manchester City. He joined Burnley in the summer of 2013, before signing a professional contract with the club on 15 April 2015. Having started the 2015–16 season with 16 goals from 14 starts for the under-21 team, Massanka signed a new contract with Burnley on 23 December 2015. He joined League Two club York City, on loan for the rest of 2015–16 on 12 January 2016, making his debut four days later as a 56th-minute substitute in a 1–0 home defeat to Newport County. Having made only three appearances for York, Massanka was recalled by Burnley on 11 March 2016.

On 31 August 2016, Massanka joined League Two club Morecambe on loan until 3 January 2017.
In January 2017, he returned to Burnley, having failed to make an impact at the club with all 10 of his appearances coming from the bench.

On 12 January 2017, Massanka joined National League club Wrexham on loan until the end of 2016–17, after being recommended to the club by Brian Flynn. He made his debut two days later as a 68th-minute substitute in a 1–0 home victory over North Ferriby United. Massanka scored his first senior goal with an overhead kick which was the equaliser in Wrexham's 3–1 home win over Guiseley on 4 February 2017.

He returned to Wrexham for a second time in July 2017, signing on an initial six-month loan deal. He scored two goals in 26 appearances before returning to Burnley in January 2018. He was loaned out to Dover Athletic on 30 August 2018.

On 10 January 2019, Massanka joined Belgian First Amateur Division side RWDM47 on loan until the end of the season. He was released by Burnley at the end of the season.

He joined newly promoted National League side Chorley on 3 August 2019, signing a one-year contract.

In February 2020, Massanka joined Eccellenza side ASD Angelana on a deal until the end of the season.

In July 2021, Massanka returned to English football to join Northern Premier League side South Shields.

In January 2022 he joined Stalybridge Celtic on loan for the remainder of the season. On 26 February it was confirmed that he had been recalled by South Shields from the loan period.  He subsequently joined Boston United and then Stafford Rangers on loan.

In January 2023, Massanka left South Shields to join Northern Premier League side Macclesfield.

Career statistics

References

External links

1996 births
Living people
Footballers from Tottenham
Footballers from Manchester
English footballers
Association football forwards
Manchester United F.C. players
Manchester City F.C. players
Burnley F.C. players
York City F.C. players
Morecambe F.C. players
Wrexham A.F.C. players
Dover Athletic F.C. players
RWDM47 players
Chorley F.C. players
South Shields F.C. (1974) players
Stalybridge Celtic F.C. players
Boston United F.C. players
Stafford Rangers F.C. players
English Football League players
National League (English football) players
Belgian Third Division players
Northern Premier League players
English expatriate footballers
Expatriate footballers in Belgium
Expatriate footballers in Italy
English expatriate sportspeople in Belgium
English expatriate sportspeople in Italy